The languages of Mauritania mainly consist of various Afroasiatic languages, including: Zenaga-Berber, Tamasheq-Berber, Hassaaniya Arabic and Standard written Arabic. French is also used due to colonial influence. Some ethnic minorities speak Niger-Congo languages.

Afro-Asiatic languages
 Berber
 Zenaga: Berber language that was more widely spoken in the past, but is still used in the south of the country, close to the River Senegal. The speakers of the Zenaga language are eponymously known as Zenaga Berbers. Otherwise, most of the Moor population speaks Berber languages. Islamisation and Arabisation of the population have reduced the number of Berber speakers. In 1978, the term Arabo-Berber to designate the Moors was replaced by Arab.
 Tamasheq: Tamasheq, the Berber language of the Tuareg, is spoken in the extreme south-east of the country, close to the Malian border.
 Arabic
 Modern Standard Arabic: the official language of the government of Mauritania.
 Hassaniyya Arabic: the colloquial spoken variety of Arabic. It is close to the dialect used by the Bedouins. The language serves as a lingua franca. It is also the language of the Imraguen who also use elements of Soninke.

French

According to Ethnologue, there are 705,500 speakers of French in Mauritania. It serves as a de facto national working language. Mauritania is a member of the International Organisation of La Francophonie (La Francophonie).

Niger-Congo languages
 Wolof
 Soninke
 Pulaar is spoken in Mauritania by the Fula and the Toucouleur.
 Bambara

See also

Hassaniya Arabic
Mauritania
Moors

Notes

External links
Linguistic map of Mauritania at Muturzikin.com